River Crane may refer to several places:

 River Crane, London, a tributary of the River Thames, London, England
 River Crane, Dorset, a river in Dorset, England

See also
 Crane River, Manitoba, Canada, a community